Banaras - Anand Vihar Terminal Garib Rath Express is a train between Banaras and Anand Vihar Terminal of Delhi. A fortnightly train that runs from Banaras on Sunday and Thursday as 22407 and from Anand Vihar Terminal on Monday and Friday as 22408. Earlier the train was triweekly from both sides.

The main towns along the route are Bhadohi, Pratapgarh, Amethi, Rae Bareli, Lucknow, Bareilly and Moradabad.

Traction

Previously the train was hauled by WDP3A from TKD shed; WDP4B/WDP4D,WDM3A or  WDM3D from LKO shed but due to post electrification it is hauled by WAP5/7 from GZB shed end to end both side.

Change in Terminal

The terminal of this train changed twice. Earlier during introduction its terminal was old Delhi but after completion of Anand Vihar terminal in Delhi, it got shifted to clear the load of old Delhi. Furthermore its terminal shifted to Banaras Station in Manduadih from Varanasi Cantt station in October 2022 to clear the rush of Varanasi Cantt. Soon many other trains will likely be shifted to Banaras from Varanasi Cantt.

Coach Composition
This train runs with 16 Garib Rath type AC III Tier Coaches and 2 power vans. From 9 January 2022, it was decided that it be running with LHB coaches, thus making it the first LHB Garib Rath Express of Indian Railways but due to some problem it did not run with LHB coaches. The new coach composition will be 16 AC III economy coaches and 2 generation vans.

References

Passenger trains originating from Varanasi
Transport in Delhi
Garib Rath Express trains
Rail transport in Delhi